The Sparlösa Runestone, listed as Vg 119 in the Rundata catalog, is located in Västergötland and is the second most famous Swedish runestone after the Rök runestone.

Description
The Sparlösa Runestone was discovered in 1669 in the southern wall of the church at Sparlösa, now part of Vara Municipality. Before their historical value was understood, many runestones were used as construction material for roads, walls, and bridges. Following a fire at the church in 1684, the runestone was split in rebuilding the wall. It was removed from the wall in 1937 and the two sections reunited.

The stone is 1.77 metres tall and it is dated to about 800 AD based upon its transitional use of rune forms from both the elder and younger futhark, but it has a probably younger line added to it saying Gisli made this memorial after Gunnar, his brother. The dating is based on the style of the images, such as a ship, which suggest the 8th century, like similar images from Gotland. However, a sail on the ship suggests a later dating than the 8th century.

The runestone is famous for its depictions and its tantalizing and mysterious references to a great battle, the names Eric and Alrik, the father who resided in Uppsala and the text descending from the gods. The stone provides an early attestation of the place name Uppsala, and the two personal names Eric ("complete ruler") and Alrik ("everyone's ruler") are both royal names, known to have been worn by the semi-legendary Swedish Yngling dynasty at Uppsala. Moreover, the mention of a great battle is suggestive of the equally semi-legendary Swedish-Geatish wars that are mentioned in Beowulf.

The words runaʀ ræginkundu meaning "runes of divine origin" are also in the runic text on the Noleby Runestone and would appear in stanza 79 of the Hávamál of the Poetic Edda several centuries later.

The runestone has imagery on four of its sides that apparently is unrelated to the runic text and in one interpretation predates it. One side has a building at the top that is over a crescent ship with a sail marked with a cross and with two birds, possibly peacocks, on its yardarms. At the bottom is a man on horseback hunting a stag and using a hunting leopard, which is not native to Sweden. The next side has an owl, with a  head reminding of a lion's, and a goose fighting a snake. One side has a man and a cross band. One suggested interpretation is that the images on the stone are a memorial to Theodoric the Great, king of the Ostrogoths from 471 to 526 AD, with the building depicted on the stone a representation of his mausoleum. The other images, such as the crescent ship and the lion fighting the snake, can be interpreted as iconography of the Arian Christian faith.

Inscription

Transliteration of the runes into Latin characters
§A a⁑iuls kaf ⁓ airikis sunʀ kaf alrik- -
§B ---t---la kaf rau- at kialt(i) · …a sa- faþiʀ ubsal faþiʀ suaþ a-a-u--ba …-ąmas nątu auk takaʀ ⁓ aslriku lu--ʀ ukþ-t a(i)u(i)sl
§C …s---n(u)(ʀ)-a-- þat sikmar aiti makuʀ airikis makin(i)aru þuną · aft aiuis uk raþ runąʀ þaʀ raki-ukutu iu þar suaþ aliriku lu(b)u faþi '
§D ui(u)-am …--ukrþsar(s)k(s)nuibin- ---kunʀ(u)k(l)ius-- …iu
§E : kisli : karþi : iftiʀ : kunar : bruþur [:] kubl : þisi

Transcription into Old Norse
A Æivisl gaf, Æiriks sunʀ, gaf Alrik[ʀ] ...
B ... gaf <rau-> at gialdi [Þ]a(?) sa[t] faðiʀ Upsal(?), faðiʀ svað ... ... nætʀ ok dagaʀ. Alrikʀ <lu--ʀ> ugð[i]t(?) Æivisl
C ... þat Sigmarr hæiti maguʀ Æiriks. Mæginiaru(?) <þuno> aft Æivisl. Ok rað runaʀ þaʀ rægi[n]kundu <iu> þar, svað Alrikʀ <lubu> faði.
D <uiu-am> ... ... ...
E Gisli gærði æftiʀ Gunnar, broður, kumbl þessi.

Translation in English
A Eyvísl(?), Eiríkr's son gave, Alríkr gave... 
B ... gave ... as payment. Then(?) the father sat(?) (in) Uppsala(?), the father that ... ... nights and days. Alríkr <lu--r> feared(?) not Eyvísl(?). 
C ... that Eiríkr's boy is called Sigmarr/celebrated-for-victories. Mighty battle(?) ... in memory of Eyvísl(?). And interpret the runes of divine origin there... , that Alríkr <lubu> coloured. 
D ... ... ... 
E Gísli made this monument in memory of Gunnarr, (his) brother.

Photographs

References

External links
Photographs of the four sides of the Sparlösa Runestone: 1, 2, 3, and 4 - Swedish National Heritage Board
Swedish language presentation by Wadbring

This link replaces the link to the article on the depictions of the Sparlösa Rune stone in Pyrenae http://www.historieforum.se/437619567 

Runestones in memory of Viking warriors
Runestones in Västergötland
9th-century inscriptions